Ponani Sunder (born 17 January 1969) is an Indian cricketer. He played in 35 first-class and 6 List A matches for Kerala between 1988 and 1996. In February 2020, he was named in India's squad for the Over-50s Cricket World Cup in South Africa. However, the tournament was cancelled during the third round of matches due to the COVID-19 pandemic.

References

External links
 

1969 births
Living people
Indian cricketers
Kerala cricketers
Place of birth missing (living people)